Sasaima is a municipality and town of Colombia in the department of Cundinamarca. The municipality was established in 1605 by Alonso Vasquez de Cisneros. The mayor is Gonzalo Parra Bohorquez.

References

Municipalities of Cundinamarca Department